Walter Wood Robertson (1845–1907) was a 19th-century Scottish architect. From 1877 he was Principal Architect and Surveyor for Scotland for public buildings, specialising in large urban post offices.

Life

He was born Walter Wybrown Robertson in Elie in Fife in 1845, the son of James Robertson, a weaver, and his wife Ann Nelson. In 1858 he was articled as an architect to John Chesser in Edinburgh. He also undertook studies in architecture at Edinburgh College of Art. In 1863 he moved briefly to the offices of Peddie & Kinnear before returning to John Chesser for two further years. From 1866 to 1868 he worked under Brown & Wardrop then after two years in Manchester with J. Holden & Son then Speakman & Charlesworth, also undertaking further studies in Manchester at Owens College.

In 1871 he moved to HM Office of Works in London under Sir Douglas Galton. He was President of the London Architectural Association 1876/77. In 1877 Sir John Taylor appointed him Principal Architect and Surveyor for Scotland, following the death of Robert Matheson.

He retired in 1904 and was replaced by William Thomas Oldrieve.

He had a stroke on 1 April 1907 and died at Wardie Bank in Trinity, Edinburgh on 23 April 1907.

Family

He was married to Alice Nesbit Alcorne. They had four sons and two daughters including Alan Keith Robertson (born 1881) also an architect.

Artistic Recognition

His portrait by Sir George Reid RSA is held by the Merchant Company of Edinburgh of which he was Master 1895 to 1897.

Principal Works
Restoration of Queen Margaret's tomb, Dunfermline Abbey (1881)
Completion of the Royal Scottish Museum in Edinburgh (1885)
Inland Revenue Offices in Glasgow (1885)
Sea defences at St Andrews Castle (1886)
Dumfries Post Office (1887)
Dunfermline Post Office (1889 and extension of 1902)
Major extension to the General Post Office in Edinburgh (1890)
Inverness Post Office (1891)
Major remodelling of General Post Office in Glasgow (1892)
Ayr Post Office (1892)
Royal Observatory on Blackford Hill in Edinburgh (1892-6)
Falkirk Post Office (1893)
Paisley Head Post Office (1893)
Helensburgh Post Office (1893)
Stirling Post Office (1894)
Dundee Post Office (1898)
Inland Revenue Offices, Edinburgh (1898)
Greenock Post Office (1898)
Perth Post Office (1899)
Kirkcaldy Post Office (1900)
South African War Memorial, Dunfermline Abbey (1903)
Inverness Prison (1903)
Linlithgow Post Office (1903)
Head Post Office, Aberdeen (1904)
Portobello Post Office (1904)
Dunbar Post Office (1904)
Airdrie Post Office (1905)

References

1845 births
1907 deaths
Scottish architects
People from Fife